Vasilios Sifakis (born 27 October 2001) is a Greek professional footballer who plays as a goalkeeper for Super League club OFI.

Career

OFI 

Sifakis was a key player with the U19 team of OFI, where he amassed 33 appearances.

On 9 July 2021, OFI announced the extension of his contract for two more years.

Personal life
Vasilios is the son of Myron and the younger brother of Michalis.

References

2001 births
Living people
Greek footballers
Super League Greece players
OFI Crete F.C. players
Association football goalkeepers